The Vitim (Buryat and , Vitim) is a major tributary of the Lena. Its source is east of Lake Baikal, at the confluence of rivers Vitimkan from the west and China from the east. The Vitim flows first south, bends eastwards and then northward in the Vitim Plateau. Then it flows north through the Stanovoy Highlands and the town of Bodaybo.

It is navigable from the Lena to Bodaybo. Upstream, tugs can haul barges as far as the Baikal Amur Mainline (BAM), but this is becoming rare.  

The Vitim is an excellent place for adventure rafting, but is rarely visited because of its isolation. Baissa, one of the famous localities of fossil insects is situated on the left bank of the Vitim River.

History
The first Russian to explore the river was probably Maksim Perfilyev in 1639–40, who brought back reports of the upper Amur River.
Formerly, because of its swift current, goods were hauled  overland from Chita to Romanovka. There boats were built, floated down the river, and broken up at their destination. This lasted until the late 1940s.

The Vitim event occurred in the Vitim River basin near Bodaybo on 25 September 2002. The event was probably caused by a bolide. The event was similar to Tagish Lake.

Course

Going upstream: Vitim town where the Vitim joins the Lena. A muscovite mica mine from 1705 until the late 1930s. Now a small settlement. In 1963 a 86MW dam on the Mamakan River was completed, one of the first dams built on permafrost. Bodaybo, just upstream, a gold mining center founded in 1864. Upstream, the port of Luzhki was the start of a road to the Lena gold fields. From here upstream the river goes crookedly east and then south. About  or so upstream, the Vitim is crossed by the Baikal Amur Mainline between Taksimo and Kuanda. Upriver there are more rapids and goldfields. South through the Stanovoy Mountains toward Chita, then west into the Vitim Plateau east of Lake Baikal. The river peaks in June and freezes from November to May.

Tributaries

The main tributaries of the Vitim are, from source to mouth:

 Konda (right)
 Karenga (right)
 Kalakan (right)
 Kalar (right)
 Tsipa (left)
 Muya (left)
 Bodaybo (right)
 Mamakan (left)
 Mama (left)

See also
List of rivers of Russia
Patom Highlands
Selenga Highlands
Southern Muya Range

References

External links
A scary road bridge over the Vitim next to the BAM railway bridge, at ]

Rivers of Irkutsk Oblast
Rivers of Buryatia